Donald Koboh Wellington (born 10 September 1992) is a Sierra Leonean international footballer who plays for Ghanaian club Karela United, as a striker.

Career
Wellington has played club football for Ports Authority, IFK Värnamo, Shabab Al-Ghazieh, Gem Stars, East End Lions and Karela United. Before joining Värnamo, Wellington was linked with Norwegian club Stabæk.

He made his international debut for Sierra Leone in 2011.

References

1992 births
Living people
Sierra Leonean footballers
Sierra Leone international footballers
Ports Authority F.C. players
IFK Värnamo players
Chabab Ghazieh SC players
Gem Stars F.C. players
East End Lions F.C. players
Karela United FC players
Superettan players
Association football forwards
Sierra Leonean expatriate footballers
Sierra Leonean expatriate sportspeople in Sweden
Expatriate footballers in Sweden
Sierra Leonean expatriate sportspeople in Lebanon
Expatriate footballers in Lebanon
Sierra Leonean expatriate sportspeople in Ghana
Expatriate footballers in Ghana